Leonid Ivanovich Gubanov (2 August 1928 – 24 February 2004) was a Soviet Russian actor, theater director, master of the artistic word (reader).

Born in  village of Rybatskoye in Leningrad Oblast (now in the Nevsky District of St. Petersburg).

He was awarded with the People's Artist of the USSR in 1989.

Gubanov died on 24 February 2004. He is interred in Troyekurovskoye Cemetery.

Selected filmography 
 Princess Mary as Grushnitsky (1954)
 A Weary Road as  Dmitri Orestovich (1956)
 Murder on Dante Street as Madam Coupot's son (1956)
 The Cossacks as Dmitri Olenin (1961)
 A Long Happy Life as Trofimov (1966)

Decorations and awards 
 Medal "In Commemoration of the 850th Anniversary of Moscow" (1997)
 Order of Honour (1998)
 Order of Friendship (2003)

References

External links
 

1928 births
2004 deaths
Male actors from Saint Petersburg
Soviet male film actors
Russian male film actors
Soviet stage actors
Russian stage actors
Theatre directors from Saint Petersburg
Spoken word artists
Moscow Art Theatre School alumni
People's Artists of the USSR
People's Artists of the RSFSR
Honored Artists of the RSFSR
Recipients of the Order of Honour (Russia)
Burials in Troyekurovskoye Cemetery